Yvonne Mai may refer to:
 Yvonne Mai-Graham, middle distance runner
 Yvonne Mai (actress), American-German actress